The Last Vegas is the third full-length album by the Chicago based hard rock band with the same name.

6 of the 13 songs on the album were later re-recorded for the band's major label debut Whatever Gets You Off released in 2009 on Eleven Seven Music.

The album's musical style was described as a mix of glam rock, sleaze rock and garage rock, with some elements of southern rock and punk rock.

Although being the band's third full-length, it was recorded after the band left Get Hip Records and was self-released, though gaining no promotion at all. It was the band's second full-length album with Chad Cherry on vocals.

Track listing

Personnel
Chad Cherry - lead vocals
Adam Arling - guitar
Johnny Wator – guitar
Anthony Rubino – bass
Nate Arling - drums

References

2008 albums
The Last Vegas albums
Self-released albums